Land System of the Heavenly Dynasty or System of the Heavenly Kingdom, also known as Celestial Land System, Celestial Field System, Land Programme of the Heavenly Dynasty, was a policy platform promulgated by the Taiping Heavenly Kingdom in 1853, after the capital was set in Tianjing.

Celestial Land System was the basic program of the Taiping Heavenly Kingdom, and its basic content was about the land reform system, while referring to the central and local political systems, and also about the economic system.

References

1853 establishments in China
Taiping Heavenly Kingdom